A Dutchman is a male member of the Dutch people, native to the Netherlands or descendant of one.

Dutchman may also refer to:

Entertainment
 Dutchman (play), a 1964 play  by African-American playwright Amiri Baraka
 Dutchman (film), a 1967 film directed by Anthony Harvey
 "The Dutchman", a song written by Michael Peter Smith in 1968 and popularized by Steve Goodman
 "The Dutchman", a character in the 1949 war movie Malaya, played by Sydney Greenstreet
 "The Dutchman" or Jan Strook, a character in the 2016 American action thriller film Criminal (2016 film), played by Michael Pitt

Geography
 Dutchman, West Virginia,  an unincorporated community
 Dutchman Peak, a peak in Madison County, Montana

People with the nickname
 Harry Fritz (baseball) (1890-1974), American Major League Baseball player
 Dutch Schultz (1902–1935), American gangster
 Norm Van Brocklin (1926–1983), American football player and coach

Other uses
 Dutchman (repair), a colloquial term for a short piece of  wood, stone, or metal used for repairs in construction or engineering.

See also
 Flying Dutchman (disambiguation)
 

Lists of people by nickname